Stictoleptura deyrollei is a species of beetle in the family Cerambycidae that is endemic to Turkey and North Iran.

Description
Both sexes are brown, with 2 big black dots on the wings. They fly from June to August, and live for 2–3 years.

References

Stictoleptura
Beetles described in 1895
Endemic fauna of Turkey
Beetles of Asia